The Avletim is a right tributary of the Kara-Suu in Aksy District of Jalal-Abad Region, Kyrgyzstan. The river takes its rise in the south-east slopes of the Chatkal Range. The river is used for irrigation.

References

Rivers of Kyrgyzstan